Maybelline New York (formerly The Maybelline Company and Mabelline and Co.), trading as Maybelline, is an American multinational cosmetics, skin care, fragrance, and personal care company, based in New York City. It was founded in Chicago in 1914, and has been a subsidiary of French cosmetics company L'Oréal since 1996.

History

The Maybelline Company was founded in Chicago by pharmacist Thomas Lyle Williams in 1915. Williams noticed his older sister Mabel applying a mixture of Vaseline and coal dust to her eyelashes to give them a darker, fuller look. He adapted it with a chemistry set and produced a product sold locally called Lash-Brow-Ine. 

Williams renamed his eye beautifier Maybelline in her honor. In 1917, the company produced Maybelline Cake Mascara, "the first modern eye cosmetic for everyday use," and Ultra Lash, the first mass-market automatic, in the 1960s.

In 1967, the company was sold by Williams to Plough Inc. (now Schering-Plough) in Memphis, Tennessee. The entire cosmetic production facility was moved from Chicago to Memphis over one weekend. In 1975, the company moved to Little Rock, Arkansas, where it is still located. In 1990, Schering-Plough sold Maybelline to a New York investment firm, Wasserstein Perella & Co. Maybelline’s headquarters remained in Memphis until its acquisition by L'Oréal in 1996. Its headquarters was then moved to New York City in 1996 and its factory to Brooklyn in 2000.

Spokesmodels
Maybelline received a boost when the company hired Lynda Carter as the company's beauty fashion coordinator after her television series ended; she also appeared in several of its television and print advertisements. 

Josie Maran, Miranda Kerr, Sarah Michelle Gellar, Melina Kanakaredes, Zhang Ziyi, Siti Nurhaliza, Fasha Sandha, Sheetal Mallar, Julia Stegner, Jessica White and Kristin Davis have endorsed Maybelline products. The current faces of Maybelline are Adriana Lima, Christy Turlington, Charlotte Kemp Muhl, Emily DiDonato, Beatriz Shantal, Jourdan Dunn, Josephine Skriver, Gigi Hadid, ITZY Liza Soberano and Urassaya Sperbund.

Slogans
In 1981, the company adopted its advertising slogan Maybelline, Maybelline Ooh La La which was used until 1991 when the tagline changed to Maybe she's born with it, maybe it's Maybelline. The slogan was named as one of the most recognizable straplines of the past 150 years, according to CBS Outdoor.

Criticism
In 1989, L'Oréal ceased to use animal testing in finished products prior to launch and committed to developing alternative methods. According to a 2010 report, however, animal testing of products is required by law in some countries for the sale of cosmetics. In 2021, People for the Ethical Treatment of Animals (PETA) reported that Maybelline tested on animals.

Collaborations 
In January 2019, Maybelline collaborated with the German fashion brand Puma for its limited edition collection that was marketed as Maybelline X Puma. It was claimed as the multi-taking athleisure-inspired collection and consisted of 5 products. Adriana Lima was chosen as the ambassador for the collaboration.

In May 2021, Maybelline collaborated with Marvel to create a limited edition that connects Marvel's most iconic characters with the brand's top-selling hero products.

References

External links

Chemical companies established in 1915
Cosmetics companies of the United States
Manufacturing companies based in New York City
L'Oréal brands
1915 establishments in Illinois
1996 mergers_and_acquisitions